Martha Hennessy (born 1955) is an American peace activist and member of the Catholic Worker Movement co-founded by her grandmother, Dorothy Day.

Life and work
Hennessy grew up Weathersfield, Vermont. She is the seventh child of David Hennessy and Tamar Day Hennessy, the only child of Dorothy Day. Her sister is the author Kate Hennessy. 

She worked for 30 years as an occupational therapist at the US Department of Veterans Affairs (VA) Medical Center, White River Junction Healthcare System,  in White River Junction.

She lives on her family farm in Vermont and Maryhouse Catholic Worker in New York City.

In 1979, Hennessy was arrested with many other demonstrators while attempting to occupy the Seabrook Station Nuclear Power Plant under construction in Seabrook, New Hampshire.

Since then, she has been arrested while demonstrating against the prison at Guantanamo Bay, the United States government's use of drones in war, and the use of starvation as a weapon of war in Yemen.

Hennessy is married to Steven Melanson, a carpenter and photographer. They have been married for 40 years. She is a grandmother of eight.

In 2020 Hennessy was interviewed about her life, anti-war activism and grandmother, Dorothy Day who co-founded the Catholic Worker Movement with Peter Maurin in 1933.

Kings Bay Plowshares
On April 4, 2018, she took part in the Kings Bay Plowshares action.
 
She was placed under house arrest in late May 2018 with an electronic monitoring bracelet strapped to her left ankle.

On November 13, 2020, she was sentenced to 10 months in prison for her part in breaking into Kings Bay Naval Submarine Base in Georgia to protest its stockpile of nuclear weapons.

References

1955 births
Living people
American Christian pacifists
Anti–nuclear weapons movement
Catholic Worker Movement
Civil disobedience
Peace movements
Occupational therapists
People from Weathersfield, Vermont
Religious activism